Brown Harwood (March 8, 1872 – June 26, 1963) was an American realtor and prominent leader of the Ku Klux Klan. A resident of Fort Worth, Texas, Harwood was a charter member of the Klan in that city; he eventually became Grand Dragon of the Texas Ku Klux Klan. In 1922, Harwood became imperial (national) klazik (vice-president) of the Ku Klux Klan. He stayed in that position until April 14, 1925; the arrest of Klan leader D. C. Stephenson for rape and murder in Indiana turned public opinion against the organization.

Personal
He was a second-generation Klansman, as his father, Dr. Musgrove Pettus Harwood, was a member of the original post-Civil War Klan. His father was a resident of Pulaski, Tennessee, where the Klan was founded. 

After leaving the Klan, he returned to real estate development in Fort Worth, Texas. He lived a quiet life thereafter and died in 1963 at the age of 91. He was given a freemason funeral and is buried at Rose Hill Cemetery in Fort Worth.

References

1872 births
1963 deaths
People from Fort Worth, Texas
Ku Klux Klan Grand Dragons
American real estate businesspeople
American Freemasons